is an outdoor sports facility located in the Ariake district of Kōtō, Tokyo and built for the 2020 Summer Olympics.

The venue covers a total area of 97,000 m². The BMX, freestyle BMX and skateboard facility has a maximum capacity of 6,600, 5,000, and 7,000 spectators respectively.

See also
Skateboarding at the 2020 Summer Olympics
Cycling at the 2020 Summer Olympics

References

External links 

Skateboarding spots
Sports venues in Tokyo
Venues of the 2020 Summer Olympics
Olympic skateboarding venues
Sports venues completed in 2021
2021 establishments in Japan
Buildings and structures in Koto, Tokyo